Multnomah Education Service District (MESD) is an  education service district that coordinates school events and activities throughout the school districts in Multnomah County, Oregon, United States. Its administrative offices are located at 11611 NE Ainsworth Circle in Portland.

Administration
The superintendent is Dr. Paul Coakley.

Districts
MESD operates through several school districts:
 Centennial School District
 Corbett School District
 David Douglas School District
 Gresham-Barlow School District
 Parkrose School District
 Portland Public Schools
 Reynolds School District
 Riverdale School District

Schools
MESD also directly operates several schools:
 Arata Creek School - Troutdale
 Burlingame Creek School - Gresham
 Four Creeks School - Portland
 Helensview High School - Portland
 Knott Creek School - Portland
 Riverside High School - Albany
 Wheatley School - Portland

Outdoor School

MESD also operates the Outdoor School environmental education program, serving roughly 7,000 6th-graders and 1,600 high-schoolers from throughout Multnomah County annually.

Anti-gay discrimination and retaliation
In 2015, the Oregon Bureau of Labor and Industries found MESD to have engaged in discrimination and retaliation against Brett Bigham, the 2014 Oregon Teacher of the Year, for being public about his sexual orientation. Brigham eventually agreed to a $140,000 settlement with the district.

See also

 List of school districts in Oregon

References

External links
 ESD (official website)
 Outdoor School

Education in Portland, Oregon
Education in Multnomah County, Oregon
School districts in Oregon
Local government in Oregon
Education in Gresham, Oregon